Joseph Wintergerst (3 October 1783, Wallerstein - 25 January 1867, Düsseldorf) was a German painter in the Romantic style; associated with the Nazarene movement.

Life and work 
He was born to the painter, Anton Wintergerst (1737–1805), and his second wife, Maria Barbara née Bux, daughter of the faience maker, Johann Baptist Bux (1716-1800). After 1804, he attended the Academy of Fine Arts Munich, then the Academy of Fine Arts Vienna. There, in 1809, he became one of the co-founders of the "Lukasbund"  artists' guild. In 1811, he went to Rome with his friends, Friedrich Overbeck and Franz Pforr, and joined the artists' colony at Sant’Isidoro a Capo le Case.

After 1815, he was a drawing teacher at the gymnasium in Ellwangen. In 1822 his friend, Peter von Cornelius, hired him as a drawing teacher at the Kunstakademie Düsseldorf, where Cornelius was Acting Director. He resigned these positions in the early 1850s and retired.

His sister,  was one of his students. She also became a well known painter and drawing teacher.

References

Further reading 
 "Wintergerst, Joseph", In: Friedrich von Boetticher: Malerwerke des 19. Jahrhunderts. Beitrag zur Kunstgeschichte, Vol.2/2, Saal–Zwengauer, Boetticher’s Verlag, Dresden 1901, pg.1026 (Online)
 
 "Wintergerst, Joseph". In: Carl Brun (Ed.): Schweizerisches Künstler-Lexikon, Vol.4: Supplement A–Z. Huber & Co., 1917, pg.454 (Online)
 "Wintergerst, Joseph". In: Hans Wolfgang Singer (Ed.): Allgemeines Künstler-Lexicon. Leben und Werke der berühmtesten bildenden Künstler, Vol.5: Vialle–Zyrlein, Rütten & Loening, Frankfurt, 1921, pg.10 (Online)

External links 

1783 births
1867 deaths
German painters
Religious artists
Academy of Fine Arts Vienna alumni
Academic staff of Kunstakademie Düsseldorf
Nazarene movement
People from Donau-Ries